is a large Japanese manufacturer of metal processing equipment & machinery based in Kanagawa.
The company is headed by Mitsuo Okamoto. The company manufactures metal cutting, forming, shearing, and punching machines. The Company also develops factory automation systems and electronic equipment in addition to machine tools. Amada's products are used in fields such as the auto, computer, camera, and electric appliance industries.

History
The company was incorporated in 1946. The company stocks are listed in Tokyo and Osaka Stock Exchanges.

In March 2013, Amada Co completed an approved takeover of Miyachi Corporation (MHC), making Miyachi America a consolidated subsidiary.

Citations

External links 

(English) 

Companies listed on the Tokyo Stock Exchange
Manufacturing companies of Japan
Companies based in Kanagawa Prefecture